Stanisław Motyka (6 May 1906 – 7 July 1941) was a Polish skier. He competed in the Nordic combined event at the 1928 Winter Olympics. He was killed during World War II.

References

External links
 

1906 births
1941 deaths
Polish male Nordic combined skiers
Olympic Nordic combined skiers of Poland
Nordic combined skiers at the 1928 Winter Olympics
Sportspeople from Zakopane
World War II refugees
Polish civilians killed in World War II
Deaths by drowning
Accidental deaths in Hungary
Polish resistance members of World War II
20th-century Polish people